Mosul District is a district in Nineveh Governorate, Iraq. Its administrative center is the city of Mosul. Other settlements include Al-Qayyarah, Al-Shurah, Hamam al-Alil, Al-Mahlaah, and Hamidat. The district is predominantly Sunni Arab, with minorities of Assyrians, Turkmen and Kurds located in the city of Mosul. 

Districts of Nineveh Governorate